The 2021–22 Idaho State Bengals men's basketball team represented Idaho State University in the 2021–22 NCAA Division I men's basketball season. The Bengals, led by third-year head coach Ryan Looney, played their home games at Reed Gym in Pocatello, Idaho as members of the Big Sky Conference.

Previous season
The Bengals finished the 2020–21 season 13–11, 8–6 in Big Sky play to finish in a tie for fourth place. As the #4 seed in the Big Sky tournament, they lost to #5 seed Montana State in the quarterfinals.

Roster

Schedule and results

|-
!colspan=12 style=| Exhibition

|-
!colspan=12 style=| Regular season

 

|-
!colspan=9 style=| Big Sky tournament

Source

References

Idaho State Bengals men's basketball seasons
Idaho State
Idaho State Bengals men's basketball
Idaho State Bengals men's basketball